Sindis Polozhani (born 2 June 2001) is a Macedonian footballer who plays as a midfielder for Women's Championship club ŽFK ACT Junajted and the North Macedonia women's national team.

Club career
Polozhani has played for Junajted in North Macedonia.

International career
Polozhani capped for North Macedonia at senior level during the UEFA Women's Euro 2022 qualifying.

References

2001 births
Living people
Macedonian women's footballers
Women's association football midfielders
North Macedonia women's international footballers
Albanian footballers from North Macedonia